Frederick Thomas (Fred) Green (April 4, 1829 – May 5, 1876) was an explorer, hunter and trader in what is now Namibia and Botswana. From 1850 to 1853 he operated in the Lake Ngami area with his older brother Charles. After 1854 he was mainly based in Damaraland in what is now Namibia.

Biography
Frederick Thomas Green was born in Montreal, Quebec, the son of William John Green and his wife Margaret Gray (daughter of John Gray, the founder of the Bank of Montreal).

William John Green, also known as William Goodall Green, worked in the commissariat department of the British Army, and was transferred to Halifax, Nova Scotia in the 1840s, where his wife died. He then moved with his younger children to the Cape Colony in about 1846, and was stationed at Grahamstown.

Lake Ngami

Fred Green's older brother Henry Green was at Bloemfontein, in the Orange River Sovereignty in the commissariat department, and later succeeded Major Warden as British Resident until the Sovereignty was abandoned in 1854. Fred and Charles Green were also in Bloemfontein at this time, but set out on an expedition to Shoshong when Charles was aged 24 and Fred 21. On that trip they met David Livingstone, and were at Livingstone's place at Kolobeng Mission on 1850-07-30.

In 1851 the Green brothers went on another trip to Lake Ngami, this time accompanied by two army officers, Edward Shelley and Gervase Bushe. Bushe and Shelley had visited Bechuanaland the previous year, but had got lost, and were arrested by the Transvaal authorities, who were apparently trying to stop others from visiting Lake Ngami. On the 1851 trip they were more successful. They met David Livingstone and William Oswell at the Botletle River on 1851-09-11, where Livingstone helped them to repair a wagon wheel. Fred Green may have gone on ahead of the others, and travelled as far as Ghanzi, near the present border with Namibia.

By early March 1852 Fred Green was back in the Orange River Sovereignty, which seems to have become the base for him and his brother Charles on their annual expeditions. On their 1852 trip to Lake Ngami Charles and Fred Green visited the Bakwena chief Setshele I at Kolobeng, and left 50 cattle with him for their return journey, as they were planning to travel in country infested by tsetse fly. At some point in their journey they fell in with Samuel Edwards (son of a missionary), J.H. Wilson (Setshele's son-in-law), and Donald Campbell, with whom they explored the north shore of Lake Ngami. They travelled about 120 miles west of the lake when they reached elephant country, but it was also fly country, and they lost 34 horses and 50 head of cattle.

On their return to Kolobeng they discovered that Boers had raided Kolobeng and made off with the cattle they had left with Setshele, and had taken some 200 women and nearly 1000 children into slavery. Livingstone likewise returned to discover that his home had been plundered by the Boer raiders. Charles and Fred Green returned to Bloemfontein in January 1853 accompanied by Edwards (who acted as Setchele's interpreter) to lay a complaint with the British authorities there (in the person of their brother Henry Green, the British Resident). After deciding that a trip to Cape Town would not accomplish much, Charles Green held a collection for Setshele, and apparently took him home again, though some sources say that Setchele actually got as far as Cape Town before returning. Henry Green was warned in a letter by Sir George Cathcart, governor of the Cape Colony, not to listen to his brothers and espouse Setshele's cause.

Fred Green, then 23, remained in Bloemfontein, staying at Tempe with Andrew Hudson Bain, a Scots farmer who had hunted in the interior in his youth. Fred spent most of his time playing billiards and hunting with army officers. Some time in the winter of 1853 Fred Green returned to the Lake Ngami area, travelling far to the east, and then in 1854 he travelled west through Damaraland to Walvis Bay, from where he went to Cape Town, presumably by sea. At the same time the Orange River Sovereignty came to an end with the Bloemfontein Convention of 1854-02-23, and in March the British garrison and civil establishment left, and the Orange Free State republic came into being. It seems likely that Fred Green thought that in view of the changed political situation the prospects for trade in the east were poor, and so turned his face westwards.

In Cape Town Fred Green met Charles John Andersson, the Swede, and entered into partnership with him, and his next trip to Lake Ngami was sponsored by Andersson.

Marriage and children
Green first married Betsey Kaipukire ua Kandendu and they had a daughter, Ada Maria Green (1864-08-24 – 1926-05-24). He next married Kate Stewardson, and they had seven children, four of whom died in infancy, except for Mary Elizabeth Green (1865-11-04 – 1952-04-18), Frederick Vincent Greene (1868-11-21 – 1949-11-26), and Alice Isabella Green (1871-08-16 – c1945). Frederick Thomas Green is the great-grandfather of politician, academic, and author Mburumba Kerina (Kerina ).

Bibliography

References

External links
 Frederick Thomas Green (family history)
 Green family history

History of Namibia
History of Botswana
1829 births
1876 deaths
Explorers of Africa
People from Montreal
Anglophone Quebec people